The following is a list of works by science fiction and fantasy author Poul Anderson.

Novels and related short stories

Science fiction

Hoka
 Earthman's Burden (1957) with Gordon R. Dickson
 Star Prince Charlie (1975) with Gordon R. Dickson
 Hoka! (1983) with Gordon R. Dickson

Reissued by Baen as:
 Hoka! Hoka! Hoka! (1998) with Gordon R. Dickson
 Hokas Pokas! (2000) with Gordon R. Dickson

The Psychotechnic League
 Star Ways (also known as The Peregrine) (1956)
 The Snows of Ganymede (1958)
 Virgin Planet (1959)
 The Psychotechnic League (1981)
 Marius (Anderson)
 Brake (Anderson)
 Cold Victory (1982)
 Starship (1982)

Tomorrow's Children
 "Tomorrow's Children" (1947) with F. N. Waldrop
 "Chain of Logic" (1947)
 "Children of Fortune" (1961)
 "Epilogue" (1961)
 Twilight World (1961)

Technic History
The technic history stories embrace a single future history including the Polesotechnic league, followed by the Terran Empire and eventually a "long night". Key characters include Nicholas van Rijn, Christopher Holm, David Falkayn and Dominic Flandry. Titles are listed here by their internal chronology.

Early period
 The Saturn Game (1981)

Polesotechnic League
 War of the Wing-Men (heavily edited original book publication); later issued with the author's preferred text and title as The Man Who Counts (1958).  Stranded on an alien planet, facing starvation, Van Rijn's only hope of survival is to end an eternal war between furry "Wingmen".  So...
 Trader to the Stars (1964) (Prometheus Award), collects:
 "Hiding Place" (1961)
 "Territory" (1963)
 "The Master Key" (1964)
 The Trouble Twisters (features David Falkayn, not Van Rijn) (1966), collects:
 "The Three-Cornered Wheel" (1963)
 "A Sun Invisible" (1966)
 "The Trouble Twisters" (also known as "Trader Team") (1965)
 Satan's World (1969)
 The Earth Book of Stormgate (many stories do not feature Van Rijn) (1978). It collects:
 "Wings of Victory" (1972)
 "The Problem of Pain" (1973)
 "How to be Ethnic in One Easy Lesson" (1974)
 "Margin of Profit" (1956)
 "Esau" (also known as "Birthright") (1970)
 "The Season of Forgiveness" (1973)
 The Man Who Counts (first appearance of the unedited version of War of the Wing-Men) (1958)
 "A Little Knowledge" (1971)
 "Day of Burning" (also known as "Supernova") (1967)
 "Lodestar" (1973)
 "Wingless" (also known as "Wingless on Avalon") (1973)
 "Rescue on Avalon" (1973)
 Mirkheim (1977)
 The People of the Wind (does not feature Falkayn or Van Rijn) (1973)—Hugo and Locus SF Awards nominee, 1974 Nebula Award nominee, 1973

Terran Empire
 The Imperial Stars (2000), collects:
 Ensign Flandry (1966)
 A Circus of Hells (1970)
 The Rebel Worlds (1969)
 The Day of Their Return (does not feature Flandry) (1973)
 Agent of the Terran Empire (1965), collects:
 "Tiger by the Tail" (1951)
 "The Warriors From Nowhere (1954)
 "Honorable Enemies" (1951)
 "Hunters of the Sky Cave" (also known as "A Handful of Stars" and We Claim These Stars) (1959)
 Flandry of Terra (1965), collects:
 "The Game of Glory" (1958)
 "A Message in Secret" (also known as Mayday Orbit) (1959)
 "The Plague of Masters" (also known as "A Plague of Masters" and Earthman, Go Home!) (1960)
 A Knight of Ghosts and Shadows (1974)
 A Stone in Heaven (1979)
 The Game of Empire (features a daughter of Flandry) (1985)

The Long Night
 The Long Night (1983), collects:
 "The Star Plunderer" (1952)
 "Outpost of Empire" (1967)
 "A Tragedy of Errors" (1967)
 "The Sharing of Flesh" (1968) (Hugo, Nebula)
 "Starfog" (1967)
 The Night Face (1978). Previously published as Let the Spacemen Beware! (1963). Expanded from the 1960 novelette "A Twelvemonth and a Day".

Omnibus reprints
(Omnibus reprints of the Nicholas van Rijn and Dominic Flandry series by Baen Books)

 The Van Rijn Method (2008), collects:
 "The Saturn Game" (1981)
 "Wings of Victory" (1972)
 "The Problem of Pain" (1973)
 "Margin of Profit" (1956)
 "How to Be Ethnic in One Easy Lesson" (1974)
 "The Three-Cornered Wheel" (1963)
 "A Sun Invisible" (1966)
 "The Season of Forgiveness" (1973)
 "The Man Who Counts" (1958)
 "Esau" (also known as "Birthright") (1970)
 "Hiding Place" (1961)
 David Falkayn: Star Trader (2009), collects
 "Territory" (1963)
 "Plus Ça Change, Plus C'est La Même Chose" (1966)
 "The Trouble Twisters" (also known as "Trader Team") (1965)
 "Day of Burning" (also known as "Supernova") (1967)
 "The Master Key" (1964)
 "Satan's World" (1969)
 "A Little Knowledge" (1971)
 "Lodestar" (1973)
 Rise of the Terran Empire (2009), collects:
 Mirkheim (1977)
 "Wingless" (also known as "Wingless on Avalon") (1973)
 "Rescue on Avalon" (1973)
 "The Star Plunderer" (1952)
 "Sargasso of Lost Starships" (1951)
 The People of the Wind (1973)
 Young Flandry (2010), collects:
 Ensign Flandry (1966)
 A Circus of Hells (1970)
 The Rebel Worlds (1969)
 Captain Flandry: Defender of the Terran Empire (2010), collects:
 "Outpost of Empire" (1967)
 The Day of Their Return (1975)
 "Tiger by the Tail" (1951)
 "Honorable Enemies" (1951)
 "The Game of Glory" (1957)
 "A Message in Secret" (1959)
 Sir Dominic Flandry: The Last Knight of Terra (2010), collects:
 "The Warriors From Nowhere" (1954)
 "Hunters of the Sky Cave" (also known as "A Handful of Stars" and We Claim These Stars) (1959)
 "The Plague of Masters" (also known as "A Plague of Masters" and Earthman, Go Home!) (1960)
 "A Knight of Ghosts and Shadows" (1974)
 Flandry's Legacy (2011) collects:
 "A Stone in Heaven" (1979)
 "The Game of Empire" (features a daughter of Flandry) (1985)
 "A Tragedy of Errors" (1967)
 "The Night Face" (1978) (also known as "Let the Spacemen Beware!" (1963), a shorter 1960 version was known as "A Twelvemonth and a Day")
 "The Sharing of Flesh" (1968) (Hugo, Nebula)
 "Starfog" (1967)

Time Patrol
 "Time Patrol" (1955)
 "Brave to be a King" (1959)
 "Gibraltar Falls" (1975)
 "The Only Game in Town" (1960)
 "Delenda Est" (1955)
 "Ivory, and Apes, and Peacocks" (1983)
 "The Sorrow of Odin the Goth" (1983)
 "Star of the Sea" (1991)
 The Year of the Ransom (1988)
 The Shield of Time (1990)
 "Death and the Knight" (1995)

The shorter works in the series have been collected numerous times over the years, in:
 Guardians of Time (1960, contains 1, 2, 4 and 5; expanded 1981 edition adds 3)
 Time Patrolman (1983, contains 6 and 7)
 Annals of the Time Patrol (1983, contains 1–7)
 The Time Patrol (1991, contains 1–9)
 Time Patrol (2006, contains 1–9 and 11).

The anthology Multiverse: Exploring Poul Anderson's Worlds (2014) - in which various SF writers take up themes from Anderson's work - includes three new Time Patrol stories:
 "A Slip in Time" by S. M. Stirling
 "Christmas in Gondwanaland" by Robert Silverberg.
 "The Far End" by Larry Niven.

History of Rustum
 Orbit Unlimited (Pyramid Books, 1961)—novel, a fix-up of four Rustum stories published in magazines from 1959 to 1961.
 New America (TOR Books, 1982)—collection including four Rustum published 1974–75, with unrelated material
 My Own, My Native Land—Rustum story first published in the anthology Continuum 1 (1974) edited by Roger Elwood.
 Passing the Love of Women—Rustum story first published in Continuum 2 (1974)
 A Fair Exchange—Rustum story first published in Continuum 3 (December 1974)
 To Promote the General Welfare—Rustum story first published in Continuum 4 (September 1975)
 The Queen of Air and Darkness, first published in The Magazine of Fantasy and Science Fiction, April 1971; winner of the Nebula Award for Best Novelette (1971), Hugo Award for Best Novella (1972), and Locus Poll Award, Best Short Fiction (1972).
 Home (1966), first published in the anthology Orbit One. Also published as The Disinherited.

Maurai and Kith
 Maurai and Kith (1982), collects:
 "Ghetto" (1954)
 "The Sky People" (1959)
 "Progress" (1961)
 "The Horn of Time the Hunter" (also known as "Homo Aquaticus", 1963)
 "Windmill" (1973)
 Orion Shall Rise (1983)
 Starfarers (1998)—Campbell Award nominee, 1999

Related: 
 There Will Be Time (1972)

Harvest of Stars
 Harvest of Stars (1993)
 The Stars Are Also Fire (1994) (Prometheus Award)
 Harvest the Fire (1995)
 The Fleet of Stars (1997)

Other novels
 Flight to Forever (serialized in 1950, paperback in 1955)
 Vault of the Ages (1952)
 Brain Wave (1954)
 Question and Answer (also known as Planet of No Return) (1954)
 No World of Their Own (1955, reissued as The Long Way Home 1958)
 The War of Two Worlds (1959)
 The Enemy Stars (also known as We Have Fed Our Sea) (1959)—Hugo Award nominee, 1959
 The High Crusade (1960)—Hugo Award nominee, 1961
 After Doomsday (1962)
 The Makeshift Rocket (1962) (expansion of "A Bicycle Built for Brew")
 Shield (1963)
 Three Worlds to Conquer (1964) (slightly expanded version of the serial which appeared in the January and March 1964 IF under the same title)
 The Corridors of Time (1965)
 The Star Fox (1965)—Nebula award nominee, 1965, Prometheus Award winner
 World Without Stars (1967)
 Tau Zero (1970) (expansion of "To Outlive Eternity")—Hugo Award nominee, 1971
 The Byworlder (1971)—Nebula Award nominee, 1971
 The Dancer from Atlantis (1971)
 There Will Be Time (1972)—Hugo Award nominee, 1973
NOTE: The future history of this novel includes the Maurai Federation mentioned above.
 Fire Time (1974)—Hugo Award nominee, 1975
 Inheritors of Earth (1974) with Gordon Eklund
 The Winter of the World (1975)
 The Avatar (1978)
 The Boat of a Million Years (1989)—Hugo Award nominee, 1990; Nebula Award nominee, 1989
 Inconstant Star (1991) (Fixup set in Larry Niven's Man-Kzin Wars universe.)
 Genesis (2000)—John W. Campbell Memorial Award, 2001
 For Love and Glory (2003)

Fantasy

King of Ys
 Roma Mater (1986) with Karen Anderson
 Gallicenae (1987) with Karen Anderson
 Dahut (1987) with Karen Anderson
 The Dog and the Wolf (1988) with Karen Anderson

Operation Otherworld
 Operation Chaos (1971)
 Operation Luna (1999)
 Operation Otherworld (1999), omnibus containing Operation Chaos and Operation Luna

Other novels
 The Broken Sword (1954, revised in 1971)
 Three Hearts and Three Lions (1961)
 The Fox, the Dog and the Griffin: A Folk Tale Adapted from the Danish of C. Molbeck (1966)
 Hrolf Kraki's Saga (1973)—British Fantasy Award, 1974
 A Midsummer Tempest (1974)—Nebula and World Fantasy Awards nominee, 1975
 The Merman's Children (1979)—Locus Fantasy Award nominee, 1980
 The Demon of Scattery (1979) with Mildred Downey Broxon, illustrated by Michael Whelan and Alicia Austin
 Conan the Rebel (1980)
 The Devil's Game (1980)
 War of the Gods (1997)
 Mother of Kings (2001)

Historical

The Golden Slave (1960)
Rogue Sword (1960)

The Last Viking
Poul and Karen Anderson collaborated on the three-part paperback original "biography" of King Harald Hardråde.
The Golden Horn (1980) with Karen Anderson
The Road of the Sea Horse (1980) with Karen Anderson
The Sign of the Raven (1980) with Karen Anderson

Mysteries

Perish by the Sword (1959)
Murder in Black Letter (1960)
Murder Bound (1962)

Collections

Strangers from Earth (1961)
Un-Man and Other Novellas (1962)
Time and Stars (1964)
The Horn of Time (1968)
Beyond the Beyond (1969, contains: Memory [originally A World Called Maanerek], 1957; Brake, 1957; Day of the Burning [originally Supernova], 1967; The Sensitive Man, 1954; The Moonrakers, 1966; Starfog, 1967)
Seven Conquests (1969) (also known as Conquests)
Tales of the Flying Mountains (1970)
The Queen of Air and Darkness and Other Stories (1973)
The Many Worlds of Poul Anderson (also known as The Book of Poul Anderson) (1974) — Edited by Roger Elwood
Homeward and Beyond (1975)
The Best of Poul Anderson (1976)
Homebrew (1976)
The Night Face & Other Stories (1979)
Winners (1981) (a collection of Anderson's Hugo-winners)
Fantasy (1981)
Explorations (1981)
The Dark Between the Stars (1981)
The Gods Laughed (1982)
The Winter of the World / The Queen of Air and Darkness (1982)
Conflict (1983) (including, among other stories, the 1966 "High Treason")
The Unicorn Trade (1984) with Karen Anderson
Past Times (1984)
Dialogue With Darkness (1985)
Space Folk (1989)
Alight in the Void (1991)
Kinship with the Stars (1991)
The Armies of Elfland (1991)
All One Universe (1996) (including, among other stories, the 1989 text "Uncleftish Beholding")
Going for Infinity (2002)
To Outlive Eternity and Other Stories (2007)
Call Me Joe (2009)
The Queen of Air and Darkness (2009)
The Saturn Game (2010)
Admiralty (2011)
Door to Anywhere (2013)
Swordsmen from the Stars (2020)

Anthologies
Nebula Award Stories Four (1969)
The Day the Sun Stood Still (1972) with Gordon R. Dickson and Robert Silverberg
A World Named Cleopatra (1977)

Nonfiction
Is There Life on Other Worlds? (1963)
The Infinite Voyage (1969)

Selected short stories
 "Brake"
 "Call Me Joe"
 "Delenda Est"
 "The Entity"
 "Eutopia"
 "The Gate of the Flying Knives" from the Thieves World anthology
 "Goat Song"
 "High Treason"
 "The Light"
 "Lodestar"
 "The Longest Voyage"
 "The Man Who Came Early"
 "Marius"
 "Memory"
 "Night Piece"
 "No Truce with Kings"
 "The Pirate"
 "The Queen of Air and Darkness"
 "The Saturn Game"
 "The Sensitive Man"
 "The Sharing of Flesh"
 "Un-Man"

References

External links 
 
 
 

Bibliographies by writer
Bibliographies of American writers
Fantasy bibliographies
Science fiction bibliographies